The 1997–98 Stanford Cardinal men's basketball team represented Stanford University as a member of the Pac-10 Conference during the 1997–98 NCAA Division I men's basketball season.  The team was led by head coach Mike Montgomery and played their home games at Maples Pavilion. Stanford finished second in the Pac-10 regular season standings and received an at-large bid to the 1998 NCAA tournament. The Cardinal would reach the Final Four for the first time in 56 years by defeating No. 14 seed College of Charleston, No. 11 seed Western Michigan, No. 2 seed Purdue, and No. 8 seed Rhode Island. The season came to and end after a 1-point overtime loss to eventual National champion Kentucky in the National Semifinals. Stanford finished with an overall record of 30–5 (15–3 Pac-10).

Roster

Schedule and results

|-
!colspan=12 style=| Regular season

|-
!colspan=12 style="background:#8C1515;"| NCAA tournament

Poll Source:
Schedule Source:

NCAA basketball tournament
West
 Stanford (#3 seed) 67, Charleston, South Carolina (#14 seed) 57
 Stanford 83, Western Michigan (#11 seed) 65
Stanford 67, Purdue (#2 seed) 59
Stanford 79, Rhode Island (#8 seed) 77
Final Four
Kentucky 86, Stanford 85

Rankings

*AP does not release post-NCAA Tournament rankings^Coaches did not release a week 2 poll

References

Stanford Cardinal
Stanford Cardinal men's basketball seasons
NCAA Division I men's basketball tournament Final Four seasons
Stanford Cardinal men's basketball
Stanford Cardinal men's basketball
Stanford